La Lucia is a wealthy suburb located in uMhlanga, north of Durban, in the KwaZulu-Natal province of South Africa. It was named after Lucia Michel. She and her husband Albert Michel founded the sugar cane farm La Lucia.

Commerce 
Although the majority of La Lucia is residential, there is commerce present within the suburb mainly in the form of retail and office space. La Lucia Mall, located near the M4 highway is the only shopping centre in the suburb which has PicknPay, Woolworths, Edgars and Virgin Active as its anchor tenants. 

In the northern section of La Lucia bordering with uMhlanga Ridge, is the La Lucia Ridge office park, a Tongaat Hulett property development which contains the corporate headquarters of several large companies.

Geography 
La Lucia is located on a large hill overlooking the Indian Ocean, forming part of the Northern Municipal Planning Region of eThekwini as well as the uMhlanga Coastal region. The suburb is located approximately 14 km north-east of Durban’s city centre and is bordered by uMhlanga Ridge to the north, uMhlanga Rocks to the east, Durban North to the south and Somerset Park and Sunningdale to the west.

La Lucia Ridge 
La Lucia Ridge is a new office node situated on a ridge overlooking the Indian Ocean and is home to some of the lower density office parks in the greater uMhlanga area. Many of the office parks in this area are set in well-maintained, sculptured indigenous gardens, located just adjacent uMhlanga Ridge on the M41. The area is home to businesses such as Aspen, Tugela Steel and Unilever. The area is easily accessed by a network of major roads, including the M41, N2 and M4.

Transport 

La Lucia is bound to the north, west and east by arterial metropolitan routes namely the M41, M4 and M12. 

The M41 highway bordering La Lucia to the north connects to the N2 highway and Mt Edgecombe in the west with two interchanges connecting to La Lucia – the M12 and Ridgeside Drive interchanges. The M4 highway (Ruth First Highway) bordering La Lucia to the east connects to Durban in the south-west and the uMhlanga Rocks CBD and Ballito in the north-east with the Armstrong Avenue interchange connecting the suburb to the freeway. The M12 (uMhlanga Rocks Drive) bordering La Lucia to the west connects to uMhlanga Ridge in the north and Durban North in the south.

Education 
Crawford College, La Lucia, established in 1999, is a large private school located in the suburb.  La Lucia Junior Primary and Victory Christian Academy are also located in La Lucia.

Demographics 
Many houses have been developed recently in La Lucia with the population growing substantially between 2001 and 2011. The population rose 121% from 2,899 to 6,414. Black Africans, Indians and Asians, saw an especially large increase in numbers.

References

Suburbs of Durban